Prisoner of Haven is a fantasy novel set in the world of Dragonlance. It was written by Nancy Varian Berberick, published in 2004. It is volume four of the six volume book series The Age of Mortals. It is set in the year 421 AC (After Cataclysm), also known as 38 SC (Second Cataclysm).

Plot summary
The book follows the adventures of sisters-in-law Dezra and Usha Majere as they are trapped in the Krynn city of Haven by a Dark Knight of Neraka and his army. The story takes place during the War of Souls.

Characters in "Prisoner of Haven"
Usha Majere
Dezra Majere
The Qui'thonas

Release details
2004, USA, Wizards of the Coast , Pub date 1 June 2004, Paperback

Reception
In a positive review, critic Don D'Ammassa praised the novel's "unusually strongly drawn characters."

References

2004 American novels
American fantasy novels
Dragonlance novels
Novels by Nancy Varian Berberick
The Age of Mortals series novels